Summer squash are squashes that are harvested when immature, while the rind is still tender and edible. Nearly all summer squashes are varieties of Cucurbita pepo, although not all Cucurbita pepo are considered summer squashes. Most summer squash have a bushy growth habit, unlike the rambling vines of many winter squashes. The name "summer squash" refers to the short storage life of these squashes, unlike that of winter squashes.

Summer squashes include:

Cousa squash, pale-colored zucchini varieties purportedly of Middle Eastern or West Asian descent. Not to be confused with cushaw, a type of winter squash. 
Pattypan squash (scallop squash)
Tromboncino or zucchetta, unusual among summer squash as being a vining plant and a Cucurbita moschata variety.
Crookneck squash
Straightneck squash
Zucchini (courgette) and marrow, respectively immature and ripe fruits of Cucurbita pepo
Immature ridge gourd luffa is used as a summer squash in India, where it is known as turiya (તુરીયા) in Gujarati or dodka.
Aehobak (Korean zucchini) belongs to the species Cucurbita moschata.

In the journals of Lewis and Clark, on October 12, 1804, Clark recorded that the Arikara tribe raised "great quantities of Corn Beens Simmins, &c." Clark also used the spelling  in his journal entries. The word simnel was used because of the visual similarity between the squash and the simnel cake.

References

External links
Squash page

Squashes and pumpkins